Duri Station is a railway station located in West Jakarta. It serves as the starting point and the eastern terminus of the Tangerang Line service. The station is a major transfer point for commuters to or from Tangerang.

This station has one side platform and two island platforms. Platform number 1 and 2 serves Cikarang Loop Line, platform 3 and 4 serves as a stop for Soekarno–Hatta Airport Rail Link, and platform number 5 serves as both starting point and terminus for Duri-Tangerang Line (Tangerang Line). These platforms are connected by a newly built overhead bridge.

Starting from 26 December 2017, Soekarno-Hatta International Airport rail link service make a stop here.

History 
Duri Station was originally a small train stop opened on 2 January 1899 by the State Railway Company, Staatssporwegen (SS). It was built in conjunction with the planned operation of the Jakarta-Angke-Rangkasbitung railway line. There is a branch to Tangerang along 23 km with a track width of 1067 mm. Then in the same year, on October 1, the SS inaugurated the 76 km Duri-Rangkasbitung railway line. Then forwarded to Serang and Anyer in 1900. Previously, from the north of line 1 there was a 2.5 km branch to the PGN Gas Factory owned by the Nederlandsch Indische Gasmaatschappij (NIGM) to serve gas transportation. However, currently those branches are no longer operational. This factory was built in 1859 which is located on the north side of Gang Ketapang which is now Jalan K.H.  Zainul Arifin. The location of this former gas factory is now used as the headquarters of PT Perusahaan Gas Negara Tbk. The former rails and intersections of this line are no longer visible because they are buried in asphalt.

Building and layout 
This station has five railway lines. Line 1 is used as a turnstile for the Yellow Line KRL in the direction of Angke and Jatinegara, while line 2 is a straight line in the direction of Tanah Abang, Depok, Nambo and Bogor.  Lines 3 and 4 are the stops for the Soekarno–Hatta Airport Rail Link heading for Sudirman Baru and Soekarno-Hatta and Line 5 is the terminus line for the Tangerang Line heading for Tangerang.

The Duri Station building was overhauled in 2017–2018 and now has two floors with elevators and escalators considering this station is one of the Soekarno-Hatta Airport Rail Link stations. The previous station building which was a legacy of the Staatsspoorwegen has been torn down due to the impact of the construction of the new station building.

Services
The following is a list of train services at the Duri Station.

Passenger services

KAI Commuter
  Cikarang Loop Line (Full Racket)
  Tangerang Line, to

KAI Bandara

Transportation

Incidents 
 On April 28, 2013, an elderly woman was killed when she was hit by the Bogor-Jatinegara KRL. The victim died on the spot.
 On April 13, 2016, a middle-aged man died when he was hit by the Duri-Tangerang KRL.  The victim died on the spot and sat in the middle of the tracks.
 On August 11, 2020, dozens of houses in the densely populated Pasar Duri area burned to the ground due to an electric short circuit.  As a result, night trips of the Commuter Line Trains at Duri Station were temporarily suspended.

Gallery

References

External links
 

West Jakarta
Railway stations in Jakarta
Railway stations opened in 1899
1899 establishments in the Dutch East Indies